Gerhard Neukum (1944-2014) was a German planetary scientist who worked on the chronology of solar system bodies.  He obtained a Ph.D. in physics at the Heidelberg University.  He was a professor at the Ludwig Maximilian University of Munich and at the Free University of Berlin.

Neukum was involved in the ESA Mars Express mission, the joint ESA-NASA Cassini–Huygens mission, the ESA Rosetta mission, and the NASA Dawn mission.

The asteroid 6150 was named after Neukum.

The crater Neukum on Mars was named after him by the IAU in 2017.

References 

20th-century German physicists
2014 deaths
1944 births
Academic staff of the Ludwig Maximilian University of Munich
Academic staff of the Free University of Berlin